Michael Penttilä (born Jukka Torsten Lindholm, formerly Michael Maria Pentholm; July 1965 in Oulu) is a Finnish serial killer. According to Alibi (a Finnish crime magazine), she is the only Finn that fits FBI's description of a serial killer.

She has considered herself a lesbian trans-woman since at least 2009.

Despite her danger, Lindholm has repeatedly been released, even with the risk of a new death, and has been the subject of much criticism from people for the over-lax functioning of the Finnish legal system.

Adolescent crimes 
In November 1981, she kidnapped a 15-year-old girl and forced her into a basement, where she beat her, choked her with scarves and threatened to rape her. She wore black leather gloves during the attack. The girl managed to escape, and despite the 16-year-old Lindholm receiving no fines, earlier thefts and attacks led her to the Kerava Youth Facility in 1984. She was released in 1985.

The first murders 
Lindholm killed her mother, 48-year-old barmaid Laina Lahja Orvokki Lindholm in their apartment in Oulu on August 26, 1985. Both Lindholm and her mother's male friend were suspected in the murder – the crime was, however, initially ignored.

The next murder Lindholm committed was on July 26, 1986. She met two 12-year-old girls down town and persuaded them to "come to her apartment so she could lend them a few marks for alcohol". Within her residence in Oulu, she locked one of the girls in the bathroom. The other girl, Titta Marjaana Kotaniemi, was knocked down on the floor and was choked to death. After some time, Lindholm released the other girl from the bathroom and sexually assaulted her. The girl escaped her grasp and ran from the apartment to the stairway, while Lindholm fled to the nearby forest where the police soon caught her. She was drunk, with 1.75 on the BAC scale.

In connection with the murder of Kotaniemi, Lindholm confessed to the police that she was mistreated by her mother. According to her statement, she had worn the blue leather gloves and the red-coloured scarf of her mother before doing so. She was angered by the fact that her mother had not been able to release her from youth facility and that she had been dating a new man, preferring to live with him rather than her father. Later, in the Oulu court, she recanted her confession and claimed she had been using multiple psychoactive drugs at once.

The Oulu District Court issued its judgment on March 17, 1987. The court ruled that Jukka Lindholm had been guilty of two charges of manslaughter as well as other crimes, condemning her for 9 years and 7 months imprisonment. However, the Rovaniemi Appellate Court held the case Laina Lindholm's death was not a murder and instead an assault or negligent homicide, and reduced the sentence to 7 years imprisonment.

Third murder 
Lindholm was granted parole in May 1992. On May 31, 1993, she choked a 42-year-old woman with a cloth belt in her Kempele apartment. Lindholm at first objected sharply to the act, claiming that somebody had set her up. On June 23, 1993, she escaped from the Oulu County Police Station with a man.

The Oulu District Court considered Lindholm to be completely sane, and sentenced her to 9.5 years imprisonment on December 13, 1993.

Following the judgment of the District Court, Lindholm contacted the investigators. She admitted to having killed the woman, but it was an accident. According to her, she had proposed explicit sex and explained that she was playing around the neck before realising that the woman had died due to choking. Lindholm had wandered off to her mother's grave after the murder, staying there for a few hours. The Appellate Court subsequently changed the sentence to 10.5 years, sending Lindholm to a special institution.

According to psychiatric reports, Lindholm admired the primordial, violent manhood of her teenage years – despite starting to wear dresses and women's underwear while in prison. The head of the Hämeenlinna Center forbade this, and Lindholm subsequently complained to the Parliament's ombudsman.

Freedom and new troubles 
Lindholm was released on parole in November 2008. Prior to her release, she was subjected to treatment, which came to a conclusion that she was not yet ready for civilian life.

In prison, she married Hannele Pentholm, who was sentenced to life imprisonment for her husband's murder. They were married for a couple of years. Since then, she renamed himself to Michael Maria Pentholm, who invited a woman to her house in May 2009. There, she tried to choke the woman with both her hands from behind.

In August 2009, Pentholm bought an Oulu apartment in Toppila via a professional jury magazine announcement. She began to choke a woman who was erecting a massage table in the apartment's living room.

A third such case occurred in September 2009: Pentholm had ordered a cleaner for her apartment and began to choke her, but she managed to escape and immediately alert the police.

On June 11, 2010, the Oulu District Court sentenced Pentholm to six years' imprisonment for three attempted manslaughters and numerous assaults. Authorities ordered Pentholm to sit through her whole sentence because, according to a mental study, she was regarded as a very dangerous offender. In April 2011, the Rovaniemi Appellate Court considered Pentholm to have committed only three aggravated assaults, lowering the sentence to 4 years and 5 months. At the same time, the Appellate Court ruled that the prerequisites for ordering Pentholm to sit out her punishment as a whole in jail did not exist.

On March 2, 2012, the Oulu District Court condemned Pentholm for 4 years and 4 months for serious rape, gross ill-treatment and false imprisonment. The cruel rape and false imprisonment had taken place on August 21–22, 2009 at a hotel in Oulu, and the assault in a company in the period from May 1–31, 2009 in Pentholm's Oulu apartment in Myllyoja. The authorities ordered Pentholm to execute her full sentence in jail, and the Appellate Court upheld the verdict in October 2012.

On Tuesday, October 13, 2015, the now renamed Michael Penttilä escaped from Laukaa's open prison during a prisoner shopping trip, but was caught the following day. She was granted parole in the spring of 2016. Penttilä's jail sentence was prolonged due to the absences and the entire term of her sentence was changed to imprisonment in a closed prison.

Penttilä was released in 2016 on Christmas. In April 2017, the police ordered for Penttilä to be arrested again for alleged aggravated crime and the preparation of a criminal offense, but the Helsinki District Court released her during the investigation.
In May 2017, the Helsinki Appellate Court annulled the decision and Penttilä was rearrested. On July 7, 2017, the Helsinki District Court dismissed the prosecution of an aggravated criminal offense or a health offense and ordered Penttilä to be released. In May 2018, the Appellate Court changed the decision and Penttilä was sentenced to 2 years and 6 months imprisonment, and to pay the victim a compensation of 4,000 euros.

On April 13, 2018, Penttilä killed a sex worker in a Helsinki apartment. The victim was found on May 4 and Penttilä was arrested two days later in Helsinki, suspected of murder. On May 17, 2018, the police announced that Penttilä had admitted during interrogations that she had committed a homicide. In July, the Helsinki District Court sentenced her to life imprisonment for murder. She had held steady discretion in the murders, using several tools such as leather belts, tights or her bare hands. Penttilä later announced that she would appeal the court's decision.

See also 
 List of serial killers by country

References 

1965 births
Finnish female serial killers
Living people
Matricides
Transgender women